Mikhail Elgin and Yaraslav Shyla were the defending champions but chose not to defend their title.

Andrey Golubev and Aleksandr Nedovyesov won the title after defeating Chung Yun-seong and Nam Ji-sung 6–4, 6–4 in the final.

Seeds

Draw

References

External links
 Main draw

President's Cup (tennis) - Men's Doubles
2019 Men's Doubles